The 2019–20 Ligue 2 (referred to as the Domino's Ligue 2 for sponsorship reasons) season was the 81st season since its establishment. The season was suspended indefinitely on 12 March 2020 due to the COVID-19 pandemic.

On 28 April 2020, the French Prime Minister Édouard Philippe announced that there would be no sporting events, even behind closed doors, before September 2020, thus in effect ending the season. On 30 April 2020, the LFP declared Lorient as champions of Ligue 2, and that the top two clubs would be promoted to Ligue 1, meaning Lens were promoted as well. The decision on relegations was deferred to the general assembly of the FFF on 20 May 2020.

On 27 May 2020, the executive committee of the FFF rejected a proposal by the LFP to have 22 clubs in the 2020–21 competition, which would have seen Orléans and Le Mans remain in the competition.

Teams

Team changes
The following were team changes with respect to the 2018–19 Ligue 2 season.

Promoted from 2018–19 Championnat National
Rodez
Chambly
Le Mans

Relegated from 2018–19 Ligue 1
Caen
Guingamp

Promoted to 2019–20 Ligue 1
Metz
Brest

Relegated to 2019–20 Championnat National
Gazélec Ajaccio
Béziers
Red Star

Stadia and locations

Personnel and kits

Managerial changes

League table

Results

Promotion play-offs
A promotion play-off competition was originally to be held at the end of the season, involving the third, fourth and fifth-placed teams in 2019–20 Ligue 2, and the 18th-placed team in 2019–20 Ligue 1. However, the matches were cancelled and the 18th-placed Ligue 1 team remained in the same division.

Cancelled bracket

Relegation play-offs
A relegation play-off was originally to be held at the end of the season between the 18th-placed Ligue 2 team and the third-placed team of the 2019–20 Championnat National. However, the matches were cancelled and both teams remained in their respective divisions.

Top scorers

Number of teams by regions

References

External links

Official site 

Ligue 2 seasons
2
France
France